Zimbabwe (abbreviated ZIM) has competed in eleven Commonwealth Games starting from the second games in 1934: first as Southern Rhodesia, then as part of Rhodesia and Nyasaland, then as Zimbabwe. Rhodesia with a white-dominated government under UDI was suspended from 1966 to 1978.

Zimbabwe boycotted the games in 1986, along with 31 other nations, in protest of Britain's reluctance to sanction apartheid South Africa.

Zimbabwe withdrew from the Commonwealth in December 2003 and has not competed since.

Medal tally

References

 
Zimbabwe and the Commonwealth of Nations
Nations at the Commonwealth Games